Bitta Solar Power Plant is a 40-megawatt solar power plant located in Bitta village, Gujarat, in west India. When it was commissioned in early January 2012, it was India's largest photovoltaic power plant.

Features
The over 400,000 panels are of amorphous silicon thin-film photovoltaic technology. Each panel is rated 100 or 95 Wp. Cost was approximately Rs 400 crore.

Commissioning
The power plant was commissioned on 5 January 2012, and was completed in 150 days. Adani expects to expand the power plant to 100 MW in the future.

Production

See also

 Gujarat Solar Park
 Solar power in India

References

Photovoltaic power stations in India
Solar power stations in Gujarat
2012 establishments in Gujarat
Energy infrastructure completed in 2012